George Everett Harvey (born August 18, 1945) is a former American football player who played for New Orleans Saints of the National Football League (NFL). He played college football at the University of Kansas.

References

1945 births
Living people
American football tackles
Kansas Jayhawks football players
New Orleans Saints players
Players of American football from Kansas
Sportspeople from Topeka, Kansas